The Mandŏk Line is an electrified standard-gauge secondary line of the Korean State Railway in Hŏch'ŏn County, South Hamgyŏng Province, North Korea running from Hŏch'ŏn on the Hŏch'ŏn Line to Mandŏk.

History
This line was opened by the privately owned Tanp'ung Railway as a branch of its Tanchon−Honggun mainline opened on 26 August 1939.

Services

A pair of local passenger trains 931/932 are known to operate on this line between Hŏch'ŏn and Mandŏk.

Route
A yellow background in the "Distance" box indicates that section of the line is not electrified.

References

Railway lines in North Korea
Standard gauge railways in North Korea